Michael Adams (born 23 August 1999) is a British television personality. He has appeared on various programmes for CBBC, including Show Me What You're Made Of with Stacey Dooley.

Background
Adams was born in Sunderland, though was raised in Houghton-le-Spring, just outside of Durham. He was educated at Houghton Kepier School in the town between 2010 and 2015, continuing studies for a further two years at the Durham Sixth Form Centre. He had shown an interest in television from a young age.

He currently resides in Manchester, where he previously studied broadcast journalism at the University of Salford.

Career
Adams first appeared on television during continuity links on CBBC with Iain Stirling in April 2012. He later went on to appear on Blue Peter with Helen Skelton and Barney Harwood during episodes broadcast in June 2012, including one on their Big Olympic Tour. The following year he appeared on continuity links for CBBC with Sam and Mark.

He was later seen on documentary series Show Me What You're Made Of with BBC Three regular Stacey Dooley in December 2013. Whilst in Brazil filming the programme, Adams worked in a bike factory, prawn farm, technology factory, baseball cap factory and a cattle farm.

In mid-2014, Adams appeared briefly in programmes for CBBC Live in Newcastle Gateshead, and worked alongside Swizzels Matlow in designing a Geordie Love Hearts sweet, which read 'Alreet Pet'.

Archival footage of Adams featured in the fifth series of Show Me What You're Made Of in 2015, and at a similar time he began contributing to media relations surrounding soap opera Coronation Street.

In August 2017 he spoke with BBC Radio 5 Live's Phil Williams about Barbara Knox's potential departure from Coronation Street. The following month he paid tribute to the late Liz Dawn in an interview with Judith Moritz for the BBC News at Six.

In January 2019, Adams confirmed on Twitter that he would appear as an uncredited bit part in the eighth series of ITV sitcom Cold Feet. Later in the year, he appeared in the revived series of Supermarket Sweep on ITV2, hosted by Rylan Clark-Neal.

Adams has worked for both of ITV's flagship soap operas, Coronation Street and Emmerdale and regularly features across broadcast media as a television critic. In February 2022, he quizzed OJ Borg as part of BBC Radio 2's Midnight Mastermind. Adams's specialist subject was the Australian soap opera Neighbours.

Between June and October 2022, he presented the weekday breakfast show on Chatterbox Radio Manchester. Following the station's closure he was then redeployed within the same production company as main co-presenter of Your Manchester, a twice weekly online magazine programme focusing on Greater Manchester news and events. Adams had previously served as a reporter for the show since March of the same year.

Filmography

References

1999 births
People from Sunderland
Living people
English television personalities
People educated at Kepier School